Michael Brockenhuus-Schack (born 20 April 1960) is a Danish count, landowner, chamberlain  and board member. He owns Giesegaard  and Juellund at Ringsted.

Early life and education
Michael Brockenhuus-Schack is the son of count Niels Brockenhuus-Schack and his wife Madeleine Maria née d'Auchamp. He has a bachelor of Business from Copenhagen Business School (1983) and a cand.agro. degree from the Royal Veterinary and Agricultural University (1989).

Career
Brockenhuus-Schack worked for Danske Bank in 1988-95. He took over the family estate after his father in 1993. He was chair of Landbrug & Fødevarer in 2009-11. He has been a board member of Realdania since 2006 and the chair since 2014.  He has been a board member of Det Classenske Fideicommis since 2007.

Personal life
He is married to  Ulla Brockenhuus-Schack  who is a managing partner in Seed Capital. They have two children. He was operated on for colorectal cancer in 2011.

References

20th-century Danish landowners
21st-century Danish landowners
Danish counts
1960 births
People from Ringsted Municipality
Copenhagen Business School alumni
Brockenhuus family
Living people